Julia Trzenko (born 30 October 1958) better known as Julia Zenko, is an Argentine singer and actress.

Biography
Zenko was born in the La Paternal neighborhood, and she lived there until she was six years old with her parents and brother. She then she moved with her family to Villa Devoto. She lives in Coghlan. She is the daughter and granddaughter of Polish and Latvian Jewish immigrants. Her paternal grandfather was a fan and singer in the temples. In elementary school, she was part of the choir and he always remembers her music teacher named Clarita. She played the guitar; she never liked sports. She took theater courses with Edgardo Moreira.

In 1977, Zenko began to sing in clubs and pubs. She sang in the groups Trío Sol y sus Amigos, Scat Singer and Amalgama, where she was the vocalist, along with Pedro Aznar on bass, Eddie Sierra on guitar and Ricardo "Topo" Carbone on drums; she did covers and different genres, such as ballads, boleros, songs in Portuguese. She began to record commercial jingles, also under the tutelage of Parentella. She was recognized for the personality of her particular voice, in jingles for companies such as Aerolíneas Argentinas, Palette bedspreads or Express cookies.

Zenko took theater courses with Alezzo, Luis Agustoni and Augusto Fernandes. In 1983, she edited his first LP, Vital, and where he sang "Carta de un león a otro". She has recorded folklore, ballads, songs with social commitment. She sang in Argentine films such as Los pasajeros del jardín, with Graciela Borges, Señora de nadie with Luisina Brando and No toquen a la nena (with Andrea del Boca). She put her voice on curtains of famous telenovelas such as María de Nadie (with Grecia Colmenares), Dulce Ana (with Patricia Palmer) and Soy Gina (with Luisa Kuliok).

Zenko has two daughters.

Awards 
Zenko has won the following awards:
 ACE Award
 Presser Award
 Festibuga award
 Konex Award (1995, 2005 and 2015) as Female Pop and Ballad Soloist.
 Gardel Award Best Pop Female Artist Album (2018)

Discography 
 1983: Vital - PHILIPS
 1985: Travesía del alma - PHILIPS
 1986: Cambios - PHILIPS
 1987: Crecer con todo - PHILIPS
 1988: Requetepillos - PHILIPS
 1989: El remedio es cantar - PHILIPS
 1991: En tiempo real - SONY MUSIC
 1991: Vital '91 - POLYGRAM
 1992: Así va la vida - COLUMBIA
 1995: Sin rótulos - SONY 
 1998: María de Buenos Aires TELDEC
 1998: Julia de Buenos Aires - EPSA MUSIC
 2001: Tango por vos - EPSA MUSIC
 2002: Orestes
 2004: El Show de las Divorciadas
 2006: Vida mía - SONY 
 2009: Canta a MARÍA ELENA WALSH - LUCIO ALFIZ PRODUCCIONES S.R.L.
 2009: P'ra Elis - CALLE ANGOSTA DISCOS
 2013: Mi libertad - LUCIO ALFIZ PRODUCCIONES S.R.L.
 2017: Nosotras - CICLO 3
 2019: "Vuelvo a ser luz" - WARNER MUSIC

Compilations
 1995: Lo nuestro - POLYGRAM
 1997: Siempre pienso en ti - POLYGRAM
 1997: 20 Grandes éxitos - SONY MUSIC ENTERTAINMENT ARGENTINA S.A.
 2000: Mis 30 mejores canciones - SONY 
 2003: Los esenciales - SONY 
 2004: De colección - SONY 
 2009: Los elegidos - SONY 
 2020: Vuelvo a ser luz - WARNER MUSIC

Filmography

As an actress 
 1986: Mesa de noticias 
 1992: Gran Hotel Casino
 1993: ¡Dale Loly!
 2017: Mujeres perfectas (obra de teatro).
 2018: Hermanos de Sangre- El Musical

As a singer 
 1982: Pubis angelical
 1989: Los espíritus patrióticos
 1992: Soy Gina
 1995: Dulce Ana

References

External links

1958 births
Living people
Actresses from Buenos Aires
Singers from Buenos Aires
20th-century Argentine women singers
21st-century Argentine women singers
Argentine tango musicians
Argentine film actresses
Argentine musical theatre actresses
Argentine stage actresses
Argentine telenovela actresses
Argentine television actresses
Argentine people of Latvian-Jewish descent
Argentine people of Polish-Jewish descent
Jewish Argentine actresses
Jewish Argentine musicians